Oregon Railroad and Navigation Co. 197 is a 4-6-2 "Pacific" type steam locomotive built by the Baldwin Locomotive Works in 1905 for the Oregon Railroad and Navigation Company (OR&N).  It has been owned by the City of Portland since 1958, and since mid-2012 it resides at the Oregon Rail Heritage Center where it can be viewed by the public.

Revenue service (1905-1958) 
OR&N 197 was built in 1905 for pulling passenger trains on E.H. Harriman's Oregon Railroad and Navigation Company, a subsidiary to the Union Pacific Railroad in Oregon. The locomotive was first built as a Vauclain Compound along with her four other classmates, those being 194, 195, and 196. 197 arrived from the builders just in time to celebrate the 1905 Lewis and Clark Centennial Exposition. It continued to serve for Portland, Oregon, when in 1923, it and its classmates were given heavy modifications that included a new Vanderbilt-type tender. All four members were renumbered Union Pacific 3200-3203, with 197 becoming 3203; at that time, the OR&N was owned by Union Pacific. The Union Pacific used the locomotive until its retirement in January 1958, when UP donated the locomotive to the City of Portland, Oregon. It was placed on display near Oaks Amusement Park, where it was soon joined by the larger and more powerful 4-8-4 "Northern" type locomotives Southern Pacific 4449 and Spokane, Portland and Seattle 700.

First retirement (1958-1995) 
In 1975, the SP 4449 was pulled out of the park to be restored to pull the American Freedom Train which would travel across the country during the United States Bicentennial. In 1987, SP&S 700 left the park to begin a restoration of its own, leaving the 197 the last engine in the park. The locomotive can be briefly seen in the 1993 movie Free Willy, while it was sat on display near Oaks Amusement Park. Due to a parking lot expansion, the 197 was moved a short distance from its original 1950s resting place at Oaks Park. Otherwise, it sat almost forgotten until late 1995, when a small group of individuals banded together to consider returning the locomotive to operation.

First restoration career (1996-present) 
It took several months of negotiations and several more months of mechanical work to prepare the engine for movement, but by early February 1996 the 197 was almost ready to move for the first time in nearly 40 years. On February 10, 1996, it was finally removed from Oaks Park. It was then moved to the Southern Pacific (now Union Pacific) Brooklyn Roundhouse, where it once again joined SP 4449 and SP&S 700 to begin restoration. That day just happened to coincide with the height of severe flooding in the Portland area after a series of winter storms. The Willamette River was lapping at the embankment where the engine sat. The East Portland Traction Co. (now Oregon Pacific Railroad), owner of the nearby railroad right-of-way, had to clear several mudslides the preceding day, but the engine was moved without incident. 

As of 2008, the restoration was about half complete and was expected to be completed by 2012. It is being carried out by the all-volunteer "Friends of the OR&N 197".
Until 2012, OR&N 197 and Portland's other two steam locomotives were stored in the last remaining roundhouse in Portland, Oregon which was located in an active Union Pacific freight yard, the Brooklyn yard.  After UP announced plans to close the Brooklyn Roundhouse, in order to expand the freight yard to facilitate increasing intermodal traffic, the non-profit Oregon Rail Heritage Foundation was formed to develop plans, and raise funds, to build a permanent home and restoration facility for Portland's three steam locomotives.  Construction of the Oregon Rail Heritage Center (ORHC) began in October 2011. On June 26, 2012, Brooklyn Roundhouse ceased operations with three steam locomotives moving to the new site, and in early September the shelter was torn down and the turntable was removed. The ORHC opened to the public on September 22, 2012. As of 2022 OR&N 197 is still in the Oregon Rail Heritage Center being restored to operating condition.

References

External links

 Friends of OR&N 197

4-6-2 locomotives
Baldwin locomotives
3203
Individual locomotives of the United States
Rail transportation in Oregon
Standard gauge locomotives of the United States
Railway locomotives introduced in 1905
Preserved steam locomotives of Oregon